"The Weakness in Me" is a song by Joan Armatrading, from her seventh album Walk Under Ladders, released as a single in the US and Netherlands in November 1981. Despite not charting, the song has become one of Armatrading's better-known songs. Armatrading has said "it's about somebody who has an affair and they've fallen for the person that they're having the affair with, but they love the person they were with whilst they were having the affair."

B-sides 
The single featured as its B-side the original songs "Dollars" and "Crying", which remained unreleased on an album until the reissue of Walk Under Ladders.

Track listings
7": A&M / 2381-S (US)

 "The Weakness in Me" – 3:32
 "Crying" – 3:28

7": A&M / AMS 9190 (Netherlands)

 "The Weakness in Me" – 3:32
 "Dollars" – 3:29

12": A&M / AMS 12.9191 (Netherlands)

"The Weakness in Me" – 3:32
 "Dollars" – 3:29
 "Crying" – 3:28
 "Shine" – 3:49

Personnel

 Joan Armatrading – Vocals, Guitar
 Hugh Burns – Guitar
 Ray Cooper – Percussion
 Thomas Dolby – Synthesiser
 Tony Levin – Bass
 Jerry Marotta – Drums
 Andy Partridge – Guitar
 Nick Plytas – Organ, Piano

In popular culture
The song is notable for featuring on the soundtrack of the 1999 film 10 Things I Hate About You and on the Season 1 soundtrack of the TV series The L Word.

Cover versions
 In 1986, actress and singer Karla DeVito covered the song for her second album Wake 'Em Up in Tokyo. 
 In 1992, punk rock band Thelonius Monster covered the song for their fourth album Beautiful Mess.
 In 1993, folk singers Frances Black and Kieran Goss covered the song for their album Frances Black & Kieran Goss.
 In 1995, Melissa Etheridge covered the song for the compilation album Ain't Nuthin' but a She Thing. The song was then featured on her 2002 DVD concert album Live... And Alone. In 2003, Etheridge was nominated with the song for the Grammy Award for Best Female Rock Vocal Performance.
 In 2000, actress Kassie DePaiva covered the song for her debut album Naked.
 In 2000, Bob Rowe covered the song for his tribute album Tom Thumb's Blues – A Tribute to Judy Collins.
 In 2003, folk singer John Wright covered the song for his sixth album That's The Way Love Is.
 In 2005, British singer Keisha White released an R&B version of the song on her debut album Seventeen. It had been intended to be the third single from the album but it was not released. The song was then released a year later as the first single from her second album Out of My Hands. The song was produced by Lucas Secon and peaked at number 17 on the UK Singles Charts.

References

External links
"Weakness In Me (The)" lyrics from Joan Armatrading's official website

1981 songs
Joan Armatrading songs
Songs written by Joan Armatrading
Song recordings produced by Steve Lillywhite
A&M Records singles